Johannes Rider Stone House is a historic home located at Rochester in Ulster County, New York.  It includes the house (c. 1815) and a wood-frame shed (c. 1890).  It is a -story bank house built upon a linear plan.  It has a front-gable stone section with frame ells to the east and west.

It was listed on the National Register of Historic Places in 1995.

References

Houses on the National Register of Historic Places in New York (state)
Houses completed in 1815
Houses in Ulster County, New York
National Register of Historic Places in Ulster County, New York